Rhabdodendron is a genus comprising two or three species of tropical South American trees.

Rhabdodendron is placed in its own family, Rhabdodendraceae, which has only been recognized for the past few decades. The 2003 APG II system (unchanged from the 1998 APG system) assigned it to the order Caryophyllales in the clade core eudicots. The 1981 Cronquist system placed it in the order Rosales. Before the creation of the family Rhabdodendraceae, the genus Rhabdodendron had a very lively history as to taxonomic placement.

References

External links
 Rhabdodendraceae in L. Watson and M.J. Dallwitz (1992 onwards). The families of flowering plants: descriptions, illustrations, identification, information retrieval. Version: 2 June 2006. http://delta-intkey.com

Caryophyllales
Caryophyllales genera
Flora of South America